Nullarbor National Park is a protected area   in the Australian state of South Australia located in the locality of Nullarbor about  west of the state capital of Adelaide and about  west of Ceduna.

As of 2013, it is bounded to the west by the Western Australia - South Australian state border, the north by the Nullarbor Regional Reserve and to the east and the south by the Nullarbor Wilderness Protection Area.

It is classified as an IUCN Category VI protected area.  In 1980, it was listed on the now-defunct Register of the National Estate.

See also
 Nullarbor Plain
 Protected areas of South Australia

References

External links
Nullarbor National Park official webpage
Nullarbor National Park webpage on the Protected Planet website

National parks of South Australia
Nullarbor Plain
Protected areas established in 1979
1979 establishments in Australia
South Australian places listed on the defunct Register of the National Estate